Harry Frederick Schuh (September 25, 1942 – May 20, 2013) was an American football player. He was an All-American tackle at the University of Memphis in 1963 and  1964. He was the third player drafted overall in the 1965 American Football League draft, after Joe Namath and Larry Elkins. He played for the American Football League's Oakland Raiders from 1965 through 1969 as the starting right tackle, winning the AFL Championship in 1967 and playing in the Second AFL-NFL World Championship Game.  Schuh was an AFL Western Division All-Star in 1967, an AFL All-League tackle in 1969, and an AFC selection for the AFC-NFC Pro Bowl in 1970 as a member of the NFL's Raiders. But he was traded before the 1971 season for his replacement at right tackle, Bob Brown, an eventual member of the Pro Football Hall of Fame. Schuh finished his career with the Green Bay Packers. He was a member of the Raiders' All-Time Team.

Schuh died in Memphis, Tennessee on May 20, 2013.

References

1942 births
2013 deaths
American football offensive tackles
Green Bay Packers players
Los Angeles Rams players
Memphis Tigers football players
Oakland Raiders players
All-American college football players
American Football League All-League players
American Football League All-Star players
American Conference Pro Bowl players
People from Langhorne, Pennsylvania
Players of American football from Philadelphia
American Football League players